Guido Reil is a German politician who is serving as an Alternative for Germany Member of the European Parliament.

Career
Reil grew up in a modest family and became a miner after leaving high school. He was a foreman at the Prosper-Haniel mine in Bottrop before training as a locksmith. Reil was also a union leader. He was a member of Social Democratic Party of Germany (SPD) for twenty six years and was elected as a councilor for the party in Essen in 2009. However, he withdrew his SPD membership in 2016 in protest at the party's immigration policies and disagreements with Essen's SPD chairman Thomas Kutschaty. As a member of the SPD, Reil had attended to organise a demonstration against the construction of a migrant centre in Essen, however, the then Prime Minister of North Rhine-Westphalia Hannelore Kraft intervened and got the event canceled.

Reil joined the AfD in 2016 and ran in the 2017 German federal election in the directly elected constituency of Essen II where he finished third and was not elected. In the 2019 European Parliament election he was elected as number 2 on the AfD's list behind Jörg Meuthen. Reil's campaigned focused on the "rescue of the Ruhr area" and preventing the European Union from taking more powers.

References

External links

Living people
MEPs for Germany 2019–2024
Alternative for Germany MEPs
Year of birth missing (living people)
Anti-Romanian sentiment